Terence Baya (born 12 January 1998) is a French professional footballer who plays as left-back for Danish 1st Division club Vendsyssel FF.

Career
Previously a professional with Brescia in the Italian Serie B, Baya moved to US Avranches in 2018. He then transferred to Troyes in 2019, signing a contract for three years. Baya made his professional debut with Troyes in a 2–0 Ligue 2 win over Chamois Niortais on 26 July 2019.

On 8 August 2021, Baya joined Danish 1st Division club Vendsyssel FF.

References

External links
 
 
 USAMSM Profile

 

1998 births
Living people
People from Longjumeau
Association football fullbacks
French footballers
French expatriate footballers
French sportspeople of Democratic Republic of the Congo descent
CO Les Ulis players
Stade Malherbe Caen players
ASM Belfort players
Brescia Calcio players
US Avranches players
ES Troyes AC players
Vendsyssel FF players
Ligue 2 players
Championnat National players
Championnat National 3 players
French expatriate sportspeople in Italy
French expatriate sportspeople in Denmark
Expatriate footballers in Italy
Expatriate men's footballers in Denmark
Footballers from Essonne
Black French sportspeople